FC Gütersloh 2000 is a German association football club based in Gütersloh, North Rhine-Westphalia.

History 
The club was formed in 1978 out of the merger of the football sides of Sport Vereinigung Arminia Gütersloh and Deutsche Jugendkraft Gütersloh in the hopes that the new club would be more successful than its un-storied predecessors. The union was a bit of a surprise because of some ill-will that had existed between the clubs going back to Arminia's refusal to share their stadium facility with DJK, and so make it possible for them to play in the Regionalliga in the late 1960s.

Both sides had bounced back and forth between the second and third division through the late 1960s and into the 1970s. After their merger they settled down as a mid-table Amateur Oberliga Westfalen (III) club, with a couple of poor seasons leading to relegation to Verbandsliga Westfalen (IV), but always followed by immediate promotion. The club managed to play their way into the 2. Bundesliga in 1996, on the strength of a Regionalliga West/Südwest title, for a three-year stay, but in 1999 were crushed by their 7 million DM debt. The club was dissolved by a court and all its results for the season annulled.

The club was re-organized in 2000 and took up play in the Oberliga Westfalen (IV). In January 2010, it was announced that plans were in the works for a merger with SC Wiedenbrück 2000, but the proposal failed. On 27 October 2013, the Gütersloh side suffered a record defeat losing 5:8 to SpVgg Erkenschwick: the 13 goals scored matched the total of a 1985–86 match that saw DJK Hellweg Lütgendortmund down Sportfreunde Siegen 7:6. In 2014, the club was overshadowed by rumours of around its precarious financial situation and the prospect voluntary withdrawal from play. New merger talks took place with SC Wiedenbruck and SC Verl, but these ended when the club avoided bankruptcy in October 2014 under new management.

Since 2012 the club played in the tier five Oberliga Westfalen.

After repeated financial troubles, the club filed for insolvency in January 2017, and despite all efforts to secure funding through donations and sponsorship, announced the dissolution and liquidation of assets by the end of May 2017.

Surprisingly, new sponsors were presented on 26 May, which pledged to finance operations for the next three years. The insolvency filing is to be cancelled.

Rivalries 
FC Gütersloh followers share a heartfelt rivalry with nearby SC Verl whose supporters tease the "big city club" over its inconsistent performance and financial woes. In turn, FCG look down on the "village club".

Honours 
The club's honours:
 Regionalliga West/Südwest
 Champions: 1996
 Oberliga Westfalen
 Champions: 1984, 1995
 Westfalenliga – Group 1
 Champions: 1991

Notable players 

  Kemal Halat

Gallery

References

External links 

  
 Abseits Guide to German Soccer

 
FC Gutersloh 2000
Football clubs in Germany
Football clubs in North Rhine-Westphalia
Association football clubs established in 2000
2000 establishments in Germany
2. Bundesliga clubs